Legend of the Phoenix is a 2019 Chinese historical romantic comedy television series starring He Hongshan, Jeremy Tsui, Cao Xiwen and Wayne Lai. Produced by Shanghai Tencent Penguin Film Culture Communication Co., Ltd and Shanghai Drama Apple Limited, it debuted on Tencent Video and myVideo on May 28, 2019. The series followed the love story between Ye Ningzhi, a travelling artist, and General Wei Guang during the Great Liang in ancient China.

Plot
During the rule of Great Liang, an artist named Ye Ningzhi performed at a banquet in front of the Empress Dowager. However, she was accused of treason by Pang Zhen, the Princess. Luckily, Ningzhi was saved by a general named Wei Guang, who later became her lover. Two years later, Ningzhi enters the palace and becomes the palace maid of the Empress. She witnessed the struggles of the palace and politics, and with her wits and skills survives the game of power.

Cast

Main
 He Hongshan as Ye Ningzhi, a travelling artist who becomes a maid later, she loves Wei Guang.
 Jeremy Tsui as Wei Guang, a general in the Great Liang.
 Cao Xiwen as Zheng Shujun, Empress of the Great Liang.
 Wayne Lai as Lang Kun, minister.

Supporting
 Liu Min as Pang Zhen, Princess of Great Liang; sister of the Emperor of Great Liang.
 Cui Peng as Pang Tong, Emperor of Great Liang.
 Wang Xichao as Pang Yu, prince of Great Liang; brother of the Emperor of Great Liang.
 Luo Qiuyun as Ban Ling'er, a maid who becomes a concubine later, evil and dies later
 Liu Chenxia as Empress dowager.
 Bai Haitao as Yan Kuan.
 Nan Fulong as Yan Zheng.
 Wang Ruizi as Concubine Fu.
 Shao Sihan as Hua Zhangshi.
 Luo Siwei as Ah Jiao.
 Chen Haoming as Ah Qiao.
 Zhang Jialing as Zi Ling.
 Qiao Xi as Chen Xue.

Soundtrack

Production
Hong Kong director Wei Hantao (Lotus Lantern, The Story of Han Dynasty and The Starry Night, The Starry Sea) was signed to direct the series from a script by Zhang Huabiao.

For the first time, He Hongshan acted as a leading female role and Jeremy Tsui acted as a leading male role.

Principal photography started on April 15, 2018 and wrapped on July 15, 2018.

Awards and nominations

References

International broadcast

External links 

Tencent original programming
Chinese web series
2019 web series debuts
2019 Chinese television series debuts
2019 Chinese television series endings
Chinese historical television series
Television series by Tencent Penguin Pictures